Johann Adolf of Saxe-Gotha-Altenburg (18 May 1721, Gotha  – 29 April 1799, Friedrichstanneck, now a district of Eisenberg, Thuringia), was a German prince of the House of Saxe-Gotha-Altenburg and a Saxon lieutenant general.

Life 

Johann Adolf was the youngest son of Frederick II, Duke of Saxe-Gotha-Altenburg and Magdalene Augusta of Anhalt-Zerbst. The prince was educated by Gottfried Christoph Sommer in Gotha and between 1735 and 1739 in Geneva. He joined the Danish military service in 1739. On his Grand Tour in 1741 he visited France als later his sister Augusta in the United Kingdom where he also obtained a Ph.D. from the University of Oxford.

In 1742 he started his service in the army of the Electorate of Saxony where he  became holder of a regiment in 1744 that he commanded until 1746 on his own. He fought at the Battle of Hohenfriedberg. He became major general in 1746 and established his headquarter in Naumburg. In 1748 he obtained the Polish Order of the White Eagle and joined the Masonic lodge »Zu den drei Hammern« as »Chevalier de la Truelle d'Or« Master Masons in Naumburg. Johann Adolf became Saxon lieutenant general in 1753.

During The Seven Years' War he was captured by the Prussian Army near Altenburg in 1756. He has been released once he has sworn not to fight the Prussians further. Later, the Prussian Army tried to absorb his regiment.

Johann Adolf retired to Eisenberg where he had the house Markt 25 built in 1750. In 1756 he had built Schloss Friedrichstanneck nearby. After Prince Joseph of Saxe-Hildburghausen died in 1787 he became Elder of the Ernestine line of the House of Wettin, a position already hold by his older brother Frederick III until his death in 1772. Because of this position he obtained Oldisleben territory. Daniel Collenbusch became his personal physician in 1788. After Johann Adolf died in 1799 Prince Josias of Saxe-Coburg-Saalfeld became Elder of Ernestine Wettin and received the Oldisleben territory. Johann Adolf is buried at the chapel of Christiansburg Castle in Eisenberg.

Marriage and Issue 
The Ernestine duchies of Saxe-Gotha-Altenburg and Saxe-Weimar considered a marriage between Johann Adolf and Princess Ernestine Albertine of Saxe-Weimar-Eisenach, daughter of Ernest Augustus I, Duke of Saxe-Weimar-Eisenach. The negotiations delayed over the dowry. In the meantime Ernestine Albertine decided for Philip II, Count of Schaumburg-Lippe. Johann Adolf later married Marie Maximiliane Elisabeth Schauer (*25.10.1732, †31.01.1779) morganatically. They had three children of which two survived.
 Friedrich Adolph (*14.03.1760; † 17.03.1760)
 Adolph Christian Carl (*13.3.1761; † 15.09.1804)
 Johanna Adolfine Friederike (*9.1.1765; † 30.3.1835)

Marie Maximiliane Elisabeth Schauer was ennobled together with her two children on January 12, 1779 by Joseph II, Holy Roman Emperor.

Ancestors

References

Bibliography 
 
 Johann Samuel Ersch: Allgemeine Encyclopädie der Wissenschaften und Künste, Zweite Sektion, 21. Teil, Leipzig, 1842, p. 240 (digital copy)
  Ranft, Michael: Die Politische Historie von Thüringen, Meißen und Sachsen, welche der sächsische Patriot aus den bewährtesten Nachrichten in XI Stücken der studirenden Jugend in möglichster Kürze aufrichtig erzehlet, Band 10, Leipzig : Holle, 1772, p. 181f. (digital copy)

1721 births
1799 deaths
House of Saxe-Gotha-Altenburg
People from Gotha (town)
Sons of monarchs